Death in Berruecos (Spanish: Muerte en Berruecos) is a 2018 Venezuelan police drama film created and directed by Caupolicán Ovalles. It is a Venezuelan co-production with Panama through the Ibermedia Program, the Centro Nacional Autónomo de Cinematografía, the Villa del Cine Foundation and SOMOS Films. It was filmed in different locations in countries such as Venezuela, Panama and Ecuador. The film is based on the murder of General Antonio José de Sucre, and revolves around the investigation of Captain Alejandro Godoy (Luis Gerónimo Abreu), who ten years after the murder of General Antonio José de Sucre, reopens the process of his death and finds that part of the previous file that has been destroyed. The film premiered in Venezuelan cinemas on 13 April 2018.

Cast 
 Luis Gerónimo Abreu as Alejandro Godoy
 Augusto Nitti as Antonio José de Sucre
 Ignacio Márquez as García Telles
 Gerardo Lugo as José María Obando
 Laureano Olivares as Apolinar Morillo
 José Roberto Díaz as Juan José Flores
 Rafael Gil
 Malena González
 Antonio Delli
 Rosalinda Serfaty as Remedios
 Claudia La Gatta as Marquesa de Solanda
 Manuel Salazar
 Alexandra Scull as Consuelo

References

External links 
 

Hispanic and Latino American mass media